When the Guard Marches or The Girl from The Spree Woods (German:Das Spreewaldmädel) is a 1928 German silent comedy film directed by Hans Steinhoff and starring Claire Rommer, Fred Solm and Wera Engels.

The film's sets were designed by the art director Heinrich Richter.

Cast
In alphabetical order
 Teddy Bill 
 Wilhelm Diegelmann 
 Wera Engels 
 Ivan Koval-Samborsky 
 Alfred Loretto 
 Eugen Neufeld 
 Sophie Pagay 
 Claire Rommer 
 Fred Solm 
 Jakob Tiedtke
 Truus Van Aalten

References

Bibliography
 Gerhard Lamprecht. Deutsche Stummfilme: 1927-1931.

External links

1928 films
Films of the Weimar Republic
German silent feature films
Films directed by Hans Steinhoff
1928 comedy films
German comedy films
German black-and-white films
Silent comedy films
1920s German films